Cristina Salvador González (born 26 September 1991) is a Spanish competitor in synchronized swimming.

She won three silver medals at the 2013 World Aquatics Championships, a bronze at the 2011 World Aquatics Championships, and a silver at the 2009 World Aquatics Championships. She also won a silver and a bronze at the 2014 European Aquatics Championships.

Notes

References

External links
 FINA profile at Infostradasports.com
 

1991 births
Living people
Spanish synchronized swimmers
World Aquatics Championships medalists in synchronised swimming
Synchronized swimmers at the 2009 World Aquatics Championships
Synchronized swimmers at the 2011 World Aquatics Championships
Synchronized swimmers at the 2013 World Aquatics Championships
Synchronized swimmers at the 2015 World Aquatics Championships
European Aquatics Championships medalists in synchronised swimming
Place of birth missing (living people)